The Justin Winsor Prize is awarded by the Library History Round Table of the American Library Association for the best library history essay. The award was established in 1978 and named for the American Library Association's first president, Justin Winsor. Winsor (1831–1896) was a prominent writer, historian, and the long-time Librarian at Harvard University.

Award winners
1979 Dennis Thomison, The Private Wars of Chicago's Big Bill Thompson
1980 Not awarded
1981 Mary Niles Maack, Women Librarians in France: The First Generation
1982 Pamela Spence Richards, Aryan Librarianship: Academic and Research Libraries Under Hitler & Wayne A. Wiegand, British Propaganda in American Libraries, 1914-1917
1983 Robert S. Martin, Maurice F. Tauber's Louis Round Wilson: An Analysis of a Collaboration
1984 Larry Yeatman, Literary Culture and the Role of Libraries in Democratic America: Baltimore, 1815-1940
1985 Not awarded
1986 Ronald Blazek, Adult Education and Economic Opportunity in the Gilded Age: The Library, the Chautauqua, and the Railroads in DeFuniak Springs, Florida
1987 Rosalee McReynolds, American Nervousness and Turn of the Century Librarians
1988 Brother Thomas O'Connor, Library Service to the American Committee to Negotiate Peace and to the Preparatory Inquiry, 1917-1919
1989 Frederick J. Stielow, Librarians, Warriors, and Rapprochement: Carl Milam, Archibald MacLeish, and World War II
1990 John Richardson, Teaching General Reference Work: The Essential Paradigm, 1890-1900
1991 Margaret Stieg, Post-War Purge of the German Public Libraries, Democracy, and the American Reaction
1992 Joanne E. Passet, Men in a Feminized Profession: The Male Librarian, 1887-1921
1993 Not awarded
1994 Not awarded
1995 Not awarded
1996 Wayne A. Wiegand, The Amherst Method: The Origins of the Dewey Decimal Classification Scheme
1997 Cheryl Knott Malone, Houston's Colored Carnegie Library, 1907-1922
1998 Not awarded
1999 Christine Pawley, Advocate for Access: Lutie Stearns and the Traveling Libraries of the Wisconsin Free Library Commission, 1895-1914
2000 Not awarded
2001 Not awarded
2002 Marek Sroka The Destruction of Jewish Libraries and Archives in Crakow (Krakow) During World War II
2003 Not awarded
2004 Joyce M. Latham Clergy of the Mind: William S. Learned, the Carnegie Corporation, and the American Library Association
2005 Donald C. Boyd The Book Women of Kentucky: The WPA Pack Horse Library Project, 1935-1943
2006 Not awarded
2007 Dr. Jean L. Preer Promoting Citizenship: Librarians Help Get Out the Vote in the 1952 Presidential Election
2008 Jeremy Dibbell A Library of the Most Celebrated & Approved Authors: The First Purchase Collection of Union College
2009 Richard LeComte Writers Blocked: The Debate Over Public Lending Right in the United States During the 1980s
2010 Dr. Pamela R. Bleisch Spoilsmen and Daughters of the Republic: Political Interference in the Texas State Library during the tenure of Elizabeth Howard West, 1911-1925
2011 Cody White Rising from the Ashes: Lessons Learned from the Impact of Proposition 13 on Public Libraries in California
2012 Ashley Maynor All the World’s Memory: Implications for the Internet as Archive and Portal for Our Cultural Heritage
2013 Nicola Wilson Boots Book-Lovers' library, the Novel, and James Hanley's The Furys (1935)
2014 Kate Stewart The Man in the Rice Paddies Had Something to READ: Military Libraries and Intellectual Freedom in the Vietnam War
2015 Sharon McQueen The Feminization of Ferdinand: Perceptions of Gender Nonconformity in a Classic Children’s Picture Book
2016 Steven A. Knowlton Since I was a citizen, I had the right to attend the library: the key role of the public library in the civil rights movement in Memphis
2017  Alexander Ames The 'Spirit of The Fatherland': German-American Culture And Community in the Library and Archive of the German Society of Pennsylvania, 1817-2017
2018 Not awarded
2019 Steven Knowlton A Rapidly Escalating Demand: Academic Libraries and the Birth of Black Studies Programs
2020 Julie Park Infrastructure Story: The Los Angeles Central Library’s Architectural History
2021 Jennifer Burek Pierce More Than a Room with Books: The Development of Author Visits for Young People in Mid-Century U.S. Public Libraries

See also
 American Historical Association : Justin Winsor Prize, awarded between 1896 and 1938
 List of history awards
 List of social sciences awards

External links
 Justin Winsor Prize details American Library Association
  2014 Winner

Library science awards
American non-fiction literary awards
History awards
Social sciences awards
Awards established in 1978
1978 establishments in the United States